Alice Clifton was an enslaved African-American woman owned by John Bartholomew in Philadelphia.  She was brought to trial on April 18, 1787, for the murder of her infant daughter, found guilty, and sentenced to death.  Following the sentence, a mob formed in order to prevent her execution out of protest for unjust circumstances because she was coerced into killing her baby by the father of the child, Jack Shaffer.  At the time of the trial, Clifton was between fifteen and sixteen years old.  Clifton was mentioned in only one primary source known to date, the court record for her case.

Trial 
In 1787, Alice Clifton was brought to trial for slitting her child's throat with a razor.  The trial itself involves Alice Clifton very little, if at all. In fact, according to the court documentation, Alice Clifton was never called to testify. Many individuals were questioned in the trial, yet Clifton herself was never able to defend her actions. Individuals such as the Coroner, Mr. Bartholomew, and multiple doctors who examined the baby's and Clifton's bodies were brought for examination before the court. A significant number of those questioned were medically trained, thus giving the trial a heavy focus on the medical evidence of the crime as well as the alleged perpetrator. Alice Clifton, in speaking with the doctors, originally tried to defend herself by claiming that the baby had been born dead.  However, once the medical examiners made the observation that the baby was too old to have been that recently born and had bled too much from the throat wound for a newborn infant, that possibility was eliminated.

At the conclusion of the hearing, the jury found Alice Clifton guilty of infanticide and the following Saturday she was brought into court to receive a death sentence.  Up until the year of Clifton's trial, infanticide was considered a capital crime despite the fact that many juries ruled for less devastating sentences.  Clifton's status as a slave woman combined with her infanticide charges being regarded as the harm of someone else's property left Clifton vulnerable to the death sentence. Those observing the case, however, opposed this punishment so passionately that they rioted in order to spare Clifton's life. As a result of this mob, Clifton was not put to death despite her sentencing. It is unknown as to what happened to Alice Clifton following the events of this trial.

The father of the baby is, in the court record, found to be Jack Shaffer. Doctor Foulke (name otherwise unknown), one of the doctors questioned in the court record, testified that Clifton confessed to him many incidences of forced sex by Jack Shaffer, resulting in the conception of her daughter. She also claimed that Shaffer had persuaded her to murder the baby in exchange for purchasing her freedom, putting her up in his house, and making her his lady  if she were to commit the murder.

Analysis 
Throughout early America, enslaved women were valued for their childbearing and labor capabilities.  Many slave owners would purchase female slaves specifically to bear children so that they could increase the number of bodies they owned.  Consequentially, birth rates among enslaved Africans were significantly higher than those of white women both in North America and in Europe.  In Alice Clifton's case as well as others involving slave infanticide, the murdered child was considered to be destroyed property of the slave owner, adding an additional legal dimension to the situation.  Many African American women used abortifacients in an attempt to control their birth rates, which could have been done for a number of reasons, including not wanting to bear a child into slavery or claiming agency over their own body by being the ones to determine if and when they had children.  The fact that Clifton's child may also have been fathered through instances of sexual violence also most likely had significant effect on Alice's decision to take her daughter's life. Following Clifton's trial, Jack Shaffer was put on trial for these assaults against Clifton. However Shaffer, known to the town as "the fat Shaffer" and generally disliked,  was not charged with rape, but rather the equivalence of damaging property and was not found guilty for even this crime.  Clifton's identity as a slave woman, like many slave women in early America, probably contributed to this lack of guilty verdict due to the low status she held in society and the general belief that her body was not something she had ownership over.

References 

Violence against women in the United States
18th-century American women
18th-century American criminals
Criminals from Philadelphia
18th-century African-American women
18th-century American slaves